Raritebe is a genus of flowering plants belonging to the family Rubiaceae.

Its native range is Central America to Peru.

Species:
 Raritebe palicoureoides Wernham

References

Rubiaceae
Rubiaceae genera